María José Cristerna Méndez (born 1976), known professionally as The Vampire Woman or, as she prefers, The Jaguar Woman, is a Mexican lawyer, businesswoman, activist and tattoo artist. She is known for her extensive body modifications, which she embarked on as a form of activism against domestic violence. She is recognized by Guinness World Records as the most tattooed woman in the world, with 96% of her body covered, and is one of the most famous personalities in the world of tattoo art.

Biography
María José Cristerna was born in Guadalajara, Jalisco in 1976, and grew up in a religious family. At age 14, she got her first tattoo, the logo of the Swedish metal band Bathory.

She earned a degree in criminal law at the Catholic University of Mexico. During her first marriage, she was a victim of domestic violence, leading her to decide to modify her body as a sign of strength, courage, and liberation.

In addition to working as a lawyer, Cristerna is a businesswoman and has her own tattoo studio and a boutique where she sells her own clothing line called Mujeres vampiro (Vampire Women).

Body modification
Cristerna is recognized as the most tattooed woman in the world. 96% of her body is covered in tattoos, according to Guinness World Records. The remaining 4% includes the palms of her hands which is a problematic area to tattoo.

Her body modifications also include a split tongue, subdermal implants, piercings, ear expansions, eye tattoos, scarification, and dental implants.

She frequently attends international festivals and conventions on tattoos and body modification. She has also been invited onto various television programs, such as Taboo on the National Geographic Channel, and to events on body suspension.

Ripley's Believe It or Not! has erected a wax statue of Cristerna in its museums.

See also
 BMEzine
 Body suit (tattoo)
 Elaine Davidson
 The Enigma (performer)
 The Lizardman

References

External links

 

1976 births
21st-century Mexican lawyers
Anti-domestic violence activists
Artists from Guadalajara, Jalisco
People known for being heavily tattooed
People known for their body modification
Living people
21st-century Mexican businesswomen
21st-century Mexican businesspeople
Mexican women lawyers
Tattoo artists
21st-century women lawyers